Tentative Decisions is the debut solo album by Mikey Erg, released on Don Giovanni Records in 2016.

Track listing

References

Don Giovanni Records albums
2016 albums